Nether Staveley is a civil parish in South Lakeland, Cumbria, England. The parish comprises the part of the village of Staveley south of the River Gowan and River Kent, and areas of farmland south of the village.  In the 2001 census the parish had a population of 677, increasing  at the 2011 census to 710.

It has a joint parish council with Hugill and Over Staveley, formed in 2004 and called Staveley with Ings Parish Council.

See also

Listed buildings in Nether Staveley

References

External links

 Cumbria County History Trust: Staveley, Nether (nb: provisional research only – see Talk page)

Civil parishes in Cumbria
South Lakeland District